The Manuel Oreste Literary Contest is a literary contest hosted by Paradela City Council. The award ceremony is held in the Manuel Rodriguez Lopez Socio-Cultural Centre, Paradela on a yearly basis. The contest is open to writers and poets writing in either the Galician or Spanish languages, with prizes given out to the winners of each category.
It is hosted in the name of the Galician poet, author and chronicler Manuel Rodriguez Lopez, and has been held every year without interruptions since 1995, with the award ceremony for the 18th Edition scheduled for December 2013.

Criteria

Writers and Poets from anywhere in the world writing in Galician or Spanish are eligible to submit their work to the contest. The work must be maximum 20 pages long, and poetry must be maximum 100 verses long. The work must be original and unedited, and must not have won any other contest. The work must be typed, with double-spacing.
The jury evaluates all the work sent the year of the Award Ceremony, and is composed of Galician and Spanish speakers. 
The members of the jury for the 18th Edition are listed below:

José Manuel Mato Díaz (Mayor of Paradela and president of the jury);
José. Jesús Ramos Ledo (Regional Minister of Government, Education, Culture and University)
Santiago Rodríguez López (Son of Manuel Rodriguez Lopez)
Xesús Mato Mato (Clergy and Musicologist)
Xulio Xiz Ramil (Writer and Journalist)
Xavier Rodríguez Barrio (poet)

Awards

Two prizes of €600 are given, one for each category (Poetry or Prose). Accessits and Honourable mentions can also be given at the jury's discretion, but lack in economic value.
There were 958 and 968 works submitted for the 17th and 18th Editions respectively.
The prized members of all the editions are listed below:

See also

Manuel Rodriguez Lopez
Manuel Rodriguez Lopez Socio-Cultural Centre
Paradela
Poetry
Prose
Galician
Spanish

References

Spanish literary awards
Writing contests